Xerocrassa subvariegata is a species of air-breathing land snail, a pulmonate gastropod mollusk in the family Geomitridae.

Distribution

This species is endemic to Greece, where it occurs in the north-western part of the island of Crete.

See also
List of non-marine molluscs of Greece

References

 Bank, R. A.; Neubert, E. (2017). Checklist of the land and freshwater Gastropoda of Europe. Last update: July 16th, 2017

External links

 Maltzan, H. von. (1883). Diagnosen neuer kretischer Helices. Nachrichtsblatt der deutschen malakozoologischen Gesellschaft. 15: 102-106. Frankfurt am Main.

subvariegata
Molluscs of Europe
Endemic fauna of Crete
Gastropods described in 1883